R/GA is a innovation consultancy, and digital design and advertising agency, headquartered in New York City, with global offices in Austin, Los Angeles, San Francisco, Portland, London, Berlin, São Paulo, Buenos Aires, Singapore, Shanghai, Sydney and Tokyo. The company has received a number of industry honors for its creative and media work, including Adweek's Digital Agency of the Decade in 2009 and Campaign Magazine's Digital Innovation Agency of the Decade in 2019. R/GA is a subsidiary of Interpublic Group of Companies.

History
R/GA, formerly R/Greenberg Associates, was founded in 1977, by two brothers, Richard and Robert Greenberg with $15,000 of capital. Richard was the designer, while Robert was the producer and cameraman. It has restructured its business model every nine years due to the CEO's belief in numerology. Over 40 years, the company has evolved from a computer-assisted film-making studio to a digital design and consulting company, as part of a major advertising network.

1977–1985: computer-assisted film making
R/GA was founded as a design company that focused on motion graphics, live-action film, and video production. By incorporating computers into the film-making process, R/GA created the first integrated computer-assisted production process. The company became known for creating the opening title sequence for Superman in 1978. R/GA's commercial work also includes trailers, special effects, and promotions for feature films like, Alien, and Ghostbusters.

1986–1994: digital studio
R/GA created a digital studio that combined three separate media—print, television commercials, and feature films. During the period R/GA was doing this, its body of work spanned approximately 400 feature films and 4,000 television commercials. In 1986, R/GA won a technical Academy Award, and Richard Greenberg left the company to pursue other interests. In 1993, R/GA Interactive was founded as part of R/GA Digital Studios. Its purpose was to extend R/GA's scope to include interactive content, such as video games.

1995–2004: interactive advertising agency
In its third nine-year cycle, R/GA changed into an interactive advertising agency and secured IBM as a client. At the time, IBM was consolidating advertising agencies and selected R/GA to redesign the company's five-million-page website. In 2001, R/GA became the Interactive Agency of Record for Nike.

2004–2011: digital media and products
R/GA changed its agency model to account for client's increasing demand for digital media. The agency expanded globally, and built a more diverse offering including mobile, social, digital advertising, and brand development. R/GA developed the Nike+ platform.

2011 onwards: digital transformation
In 2011, the New York Times reported the company would begin to offer clients event marketing and data visualization services followed by the additions of consulting and product innovation in 2012. R/GA has a venture studio that develops digital products and services with start-ups;  this is  based on various  themes from healthcare to retail.

Notable creative work

Superman (1978)
R/GA created the opening title sequence for Superman by visually enhancing each name so it appears to be flying into the screen.  The visual imagery and special effects developed for this film launched R/GA (then known as R/Greenberg Associates) as a visual-effects company.

Nike+ (2006)
R/GA created an online brand platform that gives runners a tool to record, track, and share their running data. In 2007, Nike+ won a number of awards including Titanium and Cyber Grand Prix awards at the Cannes Lions International Advertising Festival. In 2009, Adweek named Nike+ Digital Campaign of the Decade,

Beats By Dre (2012-14)
R/GA partnered with Beats by Dre to create their music platform and advertising; key campaigns coincided with the 2012 Olympics and 2014 World Cup. The creative work won a number of awards and the brand was sold to Apple Inc. for a reported  $3 billion; after the sale, Beats Music became Apple Music.

References

External links
 R/GA official website
 R/GA By Design

Advertising agencies of the United States
Business services companies established in 1977
Interpublic Group
Companies based in New York City
1977 establishments in New York (state)